Pfaffstätt is a municipality in the district of Braunau am Inn in Austrian state of Upper Austria.

Geography
Pfaffstätt lies in the Innviertel. About 37 percent of the municipality is forest and 57 percent farmland.

References

Cities and towns in Braunau am Inn District